The Duke of Wellington is a former pub at 52 Cyprus Street, Bethnal Green, London E2.

It is a Grade II listed building, built in the mid-19th century.

It has closed as a pub and been converted into residential flats.

References

External links
 

Grade II listed pubs in London
Bethnal Green
Grade II listed buildings in the London Borough of Tower Hamlets
Former pubs in London
Pubs in the London Borough of Tower Hamlets